Arthur Lee Kinsolving Jr. (August 30, 1938 – December 4, 1974), was an American film, theater and television actor. In 1960, Kinsolving was nominated for a Golden Globe for Best Supporting Actor at the 18th Golden Globe Awards for his role as Sammy Goldenbaum in the film The Dark at the Top of the Stairs.

Early life and career
Kinsolving was born on August 30, 1938, in Boston, Massachusetts, where his father, Rev. Arthur Lee Kinsolving, was serving as the rector of Trinity Church at the time. Father Kinsolving later became the rector of St. James' Episcopal Church, which brought the family to New York City. Kinsolving began his acting career on Broadway.

Kinsolving's acting credits include performances on nearly two dozen prominent television series during the 1950s and 1960s. In a 1959 episode of The Rifleman he performed as Tim Elder, the son of an alcoholic father played by Dabbs Greer. The same year, Kinsolving played Jammie Murdock in an episode of Have Gun Will Travel titled "The Sons of Aaron Murdock." Later, in 1964, on The Twilight Zone episode "Black Leather Jackets," he was cast as an alien who falls in love with a human being portrayed by Shelley Fabares. In 1964, Kinsolving also guest starred on Gunsmoke as identical twin brothers, one good and one evil, in an episode titled "The Other Half." Also in 1964, Kinsolving played a disturbed teenager who kills his only friend by accident on an episode of "Route 66" entitled "Follow the White Dove with the Broken Wing".

Personal life
In 1969, Kinsolving married model Lillian B. Crawford. They were divorced in April 1972.

Death
On December 4, 1974, Kinsolving died in Palm Beach, Florida at the age of 36 from a sudden respiratory illness.

Filmography

References

External links 
 
 

1938 births
1974 deaths
20th-century American male actors
American male television actors
American male film actors
American male stage actors
Male actors from Boston
Male actors from New York City
American Episcopalians